Mitogen-activated protein kinase kinase kinase 14 also known as NF-kappa-B-inducing kinase (NIK) is an enzyme that in humans is encoded by the MAP3K14 gene.

Function 

This gene encodes mitogen-activated protein kinase kinase kinase 14, NIK, which is a serine/threonine protein-kinase. This kinase binds to TRAF2 and stimulates NF-κB activity. It is a critical kinase of the alternative NF-κB activation pathway. It shares sequence similarity with several other MAPKK kinases. It participates in an NF-κB-inducing signalling cascade common to receptors of the tumour-necrosis/nerve-growth factor (TNF/NGF) family and to the interleukin-1 type-I receptor.

Interactions 

MAP3K14 has been shown to interact with:
 CHUK,
 IKK2,  and
 TRAF2.

References

Further reading 

 
 
 
 
 
 
 
 
 
 
 
 
 
 
 
 
 
 
 

EC 2.7.11